XHGL-FM is a radio station on 97.7 FM in Mérida, Yucatán. It is owned by Grupo SIPSE and is known as Kiss FM with a pop format.

History
XHGL received its concession on January 23, 1969. It was owned by Andrés García Lavin, founder of Grupo SIPSE, and was the first FM station in Yucatán, broadcasting with an ERP of 8.925 kW. Power has steadily risen, to 14 kW in the 1980s, 45 kW in the 1990s, and currently 80 kW.

References

External links
Kiss FM 97.7 Facebook

Radio stations in Yucatán
Radio stations established in 1969